Zalivnoy is a rural locality (a selo) in Naumovsky Selsoviet, Sterlitamaksky District, Bashkortostan, Russia. The population was 401 as of 2010. There are 13 streets.

Geography 
Zalivnoy is located 10 km southeast of Sterlitamak (the district's administrative centre) by road. Pokrovka is the nearest rural locality.

References 

Rural localities in Sterlitamaksky District